SWERN (The South West England Regional Network) was one of the regional networks that made up Janet, the UK's research and education network. SWERN was owned and operated by the universities of Plymouth, Exeter, Bristol, Bath and the West of England and also provided high speed connections to the other South West Higher Education Institutions (HEIs). Additionally more than 40 further education institutions, specialist colleges and adult learning centres connected to the SWERN backbone to obtain Janet and Internet connectivity. SWERN served approximately 450,000 users through the region until operation of the network was handed over to Janet in 2012.

SWERN was created in 2002 in order to provide services most efficiently and economically across the whole of the South West. The networks of SWAN and BWEMAN merged to form SWERN, a company limited by guarantee. SWERN formed a contractual relationship with Janet to operate the regional network that connects sites to the Janet backbone.

SWERN was owned and operated by its member institutions. From the Board of Directors to the User Group all members of SWERN were taken from the institutions and institutions connecting to it.

SWERN also covered Cheltenham which is home two higher education agencies; UCAS, the university admissions service, and HESA, the university statistics service.

SWERN (as a network) ceased operating in December 2012. SWERN (as a company) was formally dissolved on 2 December 2014.

External links 
 www.swern.net.uk/ (no longer in existence)
 Janet

Regional academic computer networks in the United Kingdom